Edwin Stein (born 28 September 1955) is an English former professional football player and coach.

Playing career
Stein, who played as a midfielder, started his career at Edgware Town alongside his brother Brian, before the pair were signed to Luton Town in November 1977. Ed stayed at Luton for seven months before leaving due to a lack of playing time, returning to non-league football alongside working for the Liberal Party. He played non-league football for Dagenham, before making one appearance in the Football League for Barnet during the 1991–1992 season.

Stein made over 500 appearances for Barnet between 1982 and 1993, making his debut on 14 August 1982 in a 1–0 defeat at Bangor City in the Alliance Premier League in the following line up; Gary Lewin, Tony Bennett, Pat Kruse, Alan Garner, Mike Pittaway, Edwin Stein, Ronnie Howell, Gary Sargent, Steve Ragan, Stuart Atkins and Colin Barnes. Sub Peter Robinson.

Stein was voted Player of the Season at Underhill in 1988-89 by the BFC Supporters Association

Coaching career
Stein retired from professional footballer in 1992 to become manager at Barnet; at the time he was just one of two black managers in the country, alongside Keith Alexander. Stein resigned from Barnet in July 1993 in order to become Assistant Manager at Southend United, under former colleague Barry Fry. He later became manager of non-league side Harrow Borough, leaving that position in November 2003 after three-and-a-half years.

Stein took over as manager of Southern Premier Division side Banbury United in September 2012. He resigned in August 2014.

Personal life
His brothers Brian and Mark were also professional footballers. The Stein brothers were born in South Africa, and arrived in the United Kingdom in 1968 when their father Isaiah Stein, an activist with the African National Congress and former boxer, fled the country to escape police persecution and torture for his political activities. Isaiah continued his activism in Britain, serving as a member of the South African Non-Racial Olympic Committee.

Managerial statistics

References

External links
Reckless Guide to Barnet FC - Edwin Stein

1955 births
Living people
South African emigrants to the United Kingdom
English footballers
English football managers
Dagenham F.C. players
Barnet F.C. players
English Football League players
Barnet F.C. managers
Harrow Borough F.C. managers
Banbury United F.C. managers
Southend United F.C. non-playing staff
Association football wingers
Luton Town F.C. players
Edgware Town F.C. players